The Italian Journal of Anatomy and Embryology (sometimes abbreviated as the IJAE) is a quarterly peer-reviewed academic journal of anatomy and embryology. It was established in 1901 by Giulio Chiarugi and is published by Firenze University Press. It is the official journal of the Italian Society of Anatomy and Histology.  All articles are submitted in English.

Content
The journal publishes original papers, invited review articles, historical article, commentaries, obituaries, and book reviews. Its main focus is to understand anatomy through an analysis of structure, function, development and evolution.

Focal areas include: 
 
 experimental studies
 molecular and cell biology 
 application of modern imaging techniques
 comparative functional morphology
 developmental biology
 functional human anatomy
 methodological innovations in anatomical research
 significant advances in anatomical education

References

External links

Anatomy journals
Publications established in 1901
Quarterly journals
Academic journals associated with learned and professional societies
English-language journals
Developmental biology journals